The name Sonia has been used for two tropical cyclones in the Eastern Pacific Ocean.

 Tropical Storm Sonia (1983), a weak October tropical storm that never threatened land.
 Tropical Storm Sonia (2013), a weak tropical storm that made landfall in the Mexican state of Sinaloa, causing minor damage. 

Pacific hurricane set index articles